Niclas Edman (born March 26, 1991) is a Swedish  professional ice hockey player. He played with Färjestads BK in the Elitserien during the 2010–11 Elitserien season.

References

External links

1991 births
Färjestad BK players
Living people
Swedish ice hockey defencemen
Ice hockey people from Stockholm